The Park Hyatt Resort Aviara, officially the Park Hyatt Aviara Resort, Golf Club & Spa, is a five-diamond luxury hotel and resort in Carlsbad, California, United States. It is located in the Aviara neighborhood of Carlsbad and is situated above the Batiquitos Lagoon. The resort opened on June 21, 2010 and features several pools, meeting rooms and ballrooms, restaurants, a spa, and a golf course. Prior to opening under the Park Hyatt name, it was part of the Toronto-based Four Seasons chain of luxury hotels and resorts.

History
Completed in 1997, the Park Hyatt Aviara was designed in Spanish Colonial architecture and set on a plateau overlooking the Batiquitos Lagoon and Wildlife Preserve. The resort was constructed with an 18-hole Arnold Palmer-designed golf course and a  spa, which was rated a top resort spa by Zagat in 2001 and Condé Nast Traveler in 2002.

Amenities
The Aviara Golf Club, designed by Arnold Palmer, was honored with Golf Magazine's 2004 Gold Medal Resorts Award and ranked on Golf Digest's Top 75 Golf Resorts. It is considered one of Palmer's best golf courses.

Restaurants
The Park Hyatt Aviara Resort has three full-service restaurants on site. These are Vivace, an Italian restaurant; California Bistro, serving breakfast and lunch; and the Argyle Steakhouse, a steakhouse at the Aviara Golf Club.

References

External links

Golf clubs and courses in California
Hotels in California
Hyatt Hotels and Resorts
Hotel buildings completed in 1997
Buildings and structures in San Diego County, California
Hotels established in 1997
Sports venues in San Diego County, California
Carlsbad, California